Nosbusch is a German surname. There are variant spellings including "Nosbush" and "Nosbisch".  Notable people with the surname include:

Desiree Nosbusch (born 1965), Luxembourgian television presenter and actress
Keith Nosbusch, CEO Rockwell Automation

German-language surnames